Theatre of the Mind is an American psychological drama anthology series produced by Fred Coe and Ann Marlowe for the National Broadcasting Company (NBC).  Six 30 minute episodes were produced and aired on NBC from July 14 to September 15, 1949.  Each story was followed by a discussion led by moderator Dr. Houston Peterson and featuring Dr. Marina Farnum, Dr. Edward Strecher, and Claire Savage Littledale, then editor of Parents Magazine.

Actors included Lilia Skala, Faye Emerson, and Ilka Chase. Among its directors was Delbert Mann, later to win an Academy Award for directing Marty (film).

References

External links
Theatre of the Mind (TV series) at CVTA

1940s American anthology television series
1949 American television series debuts
1949 American television series endings
NBC original programming